"Wiser Time" is a single by U.S. rock band The Black Crowes, featured on the band's album Amorica, released in late 1994. The song reached number 15 in Canada, number 34 in the United Kingdom and number seven on the U.S. Billboard Album Rock Tracks chart. Music & Media described Rich and Chris Robinson's vocal harmony on the song as "perfection".

Track listings
CD 1
 "Wiser Time" - [Robinson] - 5:33
 "Wiser Time" [Edit] - [Robinson/Robinson] – 4:22
 "Jealous Again" (Acoustic) - [Robinson/Robinson] – 4:24
 "Non Fiction" (Acoustic) - [Robinson/Robinson] – 5:21
 "Thorn in My Pride" (Acoustic) - [Robinson/Robinson] – 6:08

CD 2
 "Wiser Time" [Edit] - [Robinson/Robinson] – 4:18
 "Wiser Time" [Rock Radio Remix] - [Robinson/Robinson] – 4:19
 "Wiser Time" [Album Version] - [Robinson/Robinson] – 6:04
 "Chevrolet" [Non-Album Track] - [Ed Young/Lonnie Young] – 3:29
 "She Talks to Angels" [Acoustic] - [Robinson/Robinson] – 6:18

Charts

References

1995 singles
1995 songs
American Recordings (record label) singles
The Black Crowes songs
Blues rock songs
Song recordings produced by Jack Joseph Puig
Songs written by Chris Robinson (singer)
Songs written by Rich Robinson